This is a list of crossings of the River Trent, a major river flowing through the Midlands of England.

The table lists crossings that have been identified downstream from the River Sow confluence, the first major tributary on the river. Starting at Essex Bridge it includes ferries; road, rail, foot and pipe bridges found along the river to Trent Falls. Fords are only indicated where they predate a known crossing point.  In Downstream (2008), author Tom Fort notes that over eighty historic crossings have been identified, most of which were fords or ferries. In The River Trent (2005), author Richard Stone stated that "there are around seventy bridges across the Trent".  Each crossing has been marked with its river mileage with mile zero at Essex Bridge, reaching  at Trent Falls. Along the lower reaches, marker boards in kilometres show the distance from Nottingham.

Crossings

Bibliography

References

External links

 
Trent
Trent